Hungarians in Chile include immigrants from Hungary to Chile and their descendants. In South America, more Hungarians settled in Brazil. However, Chile was a major point of passage for Hungarians to North America (the United States) and Australia. Most Hungarian immigrants to Australia from South America during the first half of the 20th century came via Chile. There is no clear record of the number of people of Hungarian descent living in the country.

Notable people
Hungarian immigrants to Chile
Juan Schwanner - Hungarian-born soccer player and soccer manager (born in Szombathely)
András Gergely - Hungarian ice hockey player (born in Budapest)
Máximo Garay - Hungarian naturalized Chilean soccer manager (born in Budapest)

Chileans of Hungarian descent
Carlos Caszely - former soccer player
Leonardo Julio Farkas Klein - businesspeople, Hungarian-Jewish parents
Salvador Litvak - Chilean-born American filmaker and social media influencer
Antonio Hartmann - former  professional tennis player, Hungarian father
Nicolás Massú - professional tennis player, Hungarian-Jewish parents 
Antonio Horvath - politician and senator
Alejandro Pakozdi - former professional tennis player, Hungarian father
Mathías Leonardo Vidangossy Rebolledo - professional soccer player

See also
Chile-Hungary relations
Hungarian people
Hungarian diaspora

External links
 Hungarian embassy in Santiago 
 University of Chile about the Hungarian Revolution of 1956 and the Hungarians who came to Chile after (in Spanish only)

References

European Chilean
Chile